"One Kiss Too Many" is a song written by Eddy Arnold, Steve Nelson and Ed Nelson Jr.   The song was first performed by Arnold and reached number one on the Most-Played Juke Box Folk Records chart (one of the forerunners of the modern Hot Country Songs chart) in 1949, spending three non-consecutive weeks in the top spot.  It was one of five number ones which Arnold achieved on the Juke Box Folk chart during 1949.

References

1949 songs
Eddy Arnold songs
Songs written by Steve Nelson (songwriter)
Songs written by Eddy Arnold
RCA Records singles
His Master's Voice singles